Ameivula mumbuca is a species of teiid lizard endemic to Brazil.

References

mumbuca
Reptiles described in 2003
Lizards of South America
Reptiles of Brazil
Taxa named by Guarino R. Colli
Taxa named by Janalee P. Caldwell
Taxa named by Gabriel C. Costa
Taxa named by Alison M. Gainsbury
Taxa named by Adrian A. Garda
Taxa named by Daniel O. Mesquita
Taxa named by Carlos M. M. R. Filho
Taxa named by Ana H. B. Soares
Taxa named by Verônica N. Silva
Taxa named by Paula H. Valdujo
Taxa named by Gustavo H. C. Vieira
Taxa named by Laurie J. Vitt
Taxa named by Fernanda P. Werneck
Taxa named by Helga C. Wiederhecker